Arielle Martin (aka Arielle Verhaaren; born July 30, 1985) is an American BMX cyclist.

She crashed in the quarter-finals at the World Championships held in Taiyuan, China, on June 2, 2008, with the result that Jill Kintner, her friend and roommate  at the Olympic Training Center in Chula Vista, California, finished in sixth place, which was enough to guarantee Jill the only automatic women's spot on the US BMX Olympic Team. USA Cycling has a 17-race points series, and Jill had 129 points to Martin's 128. Kintner made up and went beyond a 13-point deficit with her sixth place and Martin's crash, became the one US Women's representative in the BMX racing event, and received a bronze medal, a medal she says was half won by Martin, who, after crashing, returned to the training center to help Kintner train. The two say that living together in the training center just made them able to push each other, as they remained neck and neck until Martin's accident. They had worked so hard together that Kintner characterized her win as bittersweet, at first more bitter than sweet.

Martin finished a degree in exercise science in 2007 at Brigham Young University. She was married in December 2007 to Michael Verhaaren and has taken his name except for when she is involved in bike competitions. They left their Utah home on separate missions, she to train for the 2008 Olympic Games in Beijing, and he to spend a year deployed in Afghanistan with the US Army.

Martin's father was a BMX racer. As a young girl, she watched him, then started riding a BMX bike at the age of two. At 15 she turned pro and in October 2007, became the third woman in the world to do a backflip on a BMX bike.  Martin has said that missing the Beijing Olympics made her more determined than ever to remain at the top in BMX and to compete at the 2012 Olympic Games in London. Martin was selected to compete at the London 2012 Olympics but a crash during a training run on July 30 in California, hospitalized her and left her out of the team, being replaced by Brooke Crain

Martin is a member of the Church of Jesus Christ of Latter-day Saints.

References 

 http://london2012.blogs.nytimes.com/2012/07/19/2008-crash-taught-bmx-cyclist-about-humility/?_r=0
 http://archive.sltrib.com/story.php?ref=/sltrib/sports/54464470-77/martin-bmx-olympics-beijing.html.csp
 https://www.youtube.com/watch?v=lUFDHDXIaZk
 http://www.espn.com/action/bmx/story/_/id/8227925/team-usa-bmx-rider-arielle-martin-olympic-dream-crushed-second-time
 https://www.youtube.com/watch?v=UHUDzG42Fyk
 https://www.youtube.com/watch?v=UHUDzG42Fyk
 https://www.youtube.com/watch?v=5_acJPqVVe8
 http://health.abc4.com/articles/1924/Crash-and-Bloom

External links
 
 

1985 births
Living people
American female cyclists
BMX riders
Pan American Games medalists in cycling
Pan American Games silver medalists for the United States
Cyclists at the 2011 Pan American Games
Medalists at the 2011 Pan American Games
Latter Day Saints from Utah
Brigham Young University alumni